Floris Petrus Pelser (born ) is a South African rugby union player for  in the Currie Cup and the Rugby Challenge. His regular position is lock.

References

South African rugby union players
Living people
1995 births
Bethlehem
Rugby union locks
Griquas (rugby union) players
Seattle Seawolves players
Golden Lions players
Rugby union players from the Free State (province)